The Hindu Mahasabha (officially Akhil Bhārat Hindū Mahāsabhā) is a Hindu nationalist political party in India.

Founded in 1915, the Mahasabha functioned mainly as a pressure group advocating the interests of orthodox Hindus before the British Raj and within the Indian National Congress. In the 1930s, it emerged as a distinct party under the leadership of Vinayak Damodar Savarkar, who developed the far-right ideology of Hindutva ("Hinduness") and became a fierce opponent of the secular nationalism espoused by the Congress. During the Second World War, the Mahasabha supported the British war effort and briefly entered coalitions with the Muslim League in provincial and central councils. This was the time when Communist Party of India members were spying for the British Government against the fascist aggression. The party opposed the 1947 partition of India and sought the establishment of a secular and united state named Hindusthan with same rights for citizens without regards to religion. After the assassination of Indian leader Mahatma Gandhi by Hindu Mahasabha activist Nathuram Godse, the Mahasabha's fortunes diminished in Indian politics, and it was soon eclipsed by the Bharatiya Jana Sangh.

Name
The organisation was originally called Sarvadeshik Hindu Sabha ("Pan-Country Hindu Assembly"). In 1921, it changed to the present name Akhil Bharatiya Hindu Mahasabha ("All-India Hindu Grand Assembly").

History

Antecedents
Local forerunners of the Hindu Mahasabha emerged in connection with the disputes after the partition of Bengal in 1905 in British India. Under the then viceroy Lord Curzon, the division of the province of Bengal was in two new provinces of East Bengal and Assam, as well as Bengal. The new province of Bengal had a Hindu majority, the province of East Bengal and Assam was mostly Muslim. The division was justified by the British for administrative reasons.

The formation of the All India Muslim League in 1906 and the British India government's creation of separate Muslim electorate under the Morley-Minto reforms of 1909 was a catalyst for Hindu leaders coming together to create an organisation to protect the rights of the Hindu community members.

In 1909, Lal Chand and U.N. Mukerji established the Punjab Hindu Sabha ("Punjab Hindu Assembly"). The Sabha stated that it was not a sectarian organisation, but an "all-embracing movement" that aimed to safeguard the interests of "the entire Hindu community". During 21–22 October 1909, it organised the Punjab Provincial Hindu Conference, which criticised the Indian National Congress for failing to defend Hindu interests, and called for promotion of Hindu-centered politics. In this conference Sabha leaders strongly proposed that Hindus need a separate nation and the Muslims should not be given any rights in that nation. The Sabha organised five more annual provincial conferences in Punjab.

The development of the broad work for Hindu unity that started in the early 20th century in Punjab was a precursor for the formation of the All India Hindu Sabha. Over the next few years, several such Hindu Sabhas were established outside Punjab, including in United Provinces, Bihar, Bengal, Central Provinces and Berar, and Bombay Presidency.

A formal move to establish an umbrella All-India Hindu Sabha was made at the Allahabad session of Congress in 1910. A committee headed by Lala Baij Nath was set up to draw up a constitution, but it did not make much progress. Another conference of Hindu leaders in Allahabad also took the initial step to establish an All India Hindu Sabha in 1910, but this organisation did not become operational due to factional strife. On 8 December 1913, the Punjab Hindu Sabha passed a resolution to create an All India Hindu Sabha at its Ambala session. The Conference proposed holding a general conference of Hindu leaders from all over India at the 1915 Kumbh Mela in Haridwar.

Establishment
Preparatory sessions of the All India Hindu Sabha were held at Haridwar (13 February 1915), Lucknow (17 February 1915) and Delhi (27 February 1915). In April 1915, Sarvadeshak (All India) Hindu Sabha was formed as an umbrella organisation of regional Hindu Sabhas, at the Kumbh Mela in Haridwar. Gandhi and Swami Shraddhanand were also present at the conference, and were supportive of the formation of All India Hindu Sabha. The Sabha laid emphasis on Hindu solidarity and the need for social reform.

At its sixth session in April 1921, the Sarvadeshak Hindu Sabha formally changed its name to Akhil Bharat Hindu Mahasabha on the model of the Indian National Congress. Presided over by Manindra Chandra Nandi, it amended its constitution to remove the clause about loyalty to the British, and added a clause committing the organisation to a "united and self-governing" Indian nation.

Amongst the Mahasabha's early leaders was the prominent nationalist, educationalist and 
four times Indian National Congress president Pandit Madan Mohan Malaviya, who founded the Benaras Hindu University, the Punjabi populist Lala Lajpat Rai and Lajpat Rai's mentor Navin Chandra Rai of the Hindu Samaj who chaired the special Congress session of 1921 held at Lahore which gave the call for non-cooperation. Under Malaviya, the Mahasabha campaigned for Hindu political unity, for the education and economic development of Hindus as well as for the conversion of Muslims to Hinduism.

In the late 1920s, the Mahasabha came under the influence of leaders like Balakrishna Shivram Moonje and Vinayak Damodar Savarkar. Savarkar was a former revolutionary who had been banned from anti-British political activities and opposed the secularism of the Congress. Under Savarkar, the Mahasabha became a more intense critic of the Congress and its policy of wooing Muslim support. The Mahasabha suffered a setback when in 1925, its former member Keshav Baliram Hedgewar left to form the Rashtriya Swayamsevak Sangh (RSS), a Hindu volunteer organisation that abstained from active politics. Although ideologically similar to the Mahasabha, the RSS grew faster across the nation and became a competitor for the core constituency of the Mahasabha.

Indian independence movement

The Hindu Mahasabha did not unconditionally support the Indian independence movement against British rule in India. However, it became part of movement on its own conditions and with regards to protect the interests of the Hindus. For example, it boycotted the Simon Commission.In the aftermath, it was part of the all party committee, which came out with Nehru report. However, it did not accept the report as according to Mahasabha, it gave too many concessions to Muslims. Similarly, when Mahatma Gandhi observed a fast against Communal Award, Mahasabha worked with Gandhi and other parties to ensure Poona Pact is signed and Depressed Classes are given a fair representation.

Civil disobedience movement
Under the leadership of Mahatma Gandhi, the Congress led several nationwide campaigns of non-violent civil disobedience. The Mahasabha officially abstained from participating in the Civil Disobedience Movement of 1930.

Alliance with Muslim League and others
The Indian National Congress won a massive victory in the 1937 Indian provincial elections, decimating the Hindu Mahasabha. However, in 1939, the Congress ministries resigned in protest against Viceroy Lord Linlithgow's action of declaring India to be a belligerent in the Second World War without consulting the Indian people. This led to the Hindu Mahasabha joining hands with the Muslim League and other parties to form governments, in certain provinces. Such coalition governments were formed in Sindh, NWFP, and Bengal.

In Sindh, Hindu Mahasabha members joined Ghulam Hussain Hidayatullah's Muslim League government. In Savarkar's own words,"Witness the fact that only recently in Sind, the Sind-Hindu-Sabha on invitation had taken the responsibility of joining hands with the League itself in running coalition government In March 1943, Sindh Government became the first Provincial Assembly of the sub-continent to pass an official resolution in favour of the creation of Pakistan. In spite of the Hindu Mahasabha's avowed public opposition to any political division of India, the Mahasabha Ministers of the Sindh government did not resign, rather they simply "contented themselves with a protest".

In the North West Frontier Province, Hindu Mahasabha members joined hands with Sardar Aurang Zeb Khan of the Muslim League to form a government in 1943. The Mahasabha member of the cabinet was Finance Minister Mehr Chand Khanna.

In Bengal, Hindu Mahasabha joined the Krishak Praja Party led Progressive Coalition ministry of Fazlul Haq in December, 1941. Savarkar appreciated the successful functioning of the coalition government.

Quit India Movement
The Hindu Mahasabha openly opposed the call for the Quit India Movement and boycotted it officially. Vinayak Damodar Savarkar, the president of the Hindu Mahasabha at that time, even went to the extent of writing a letter titled "Stick to your Posts", in which he instructed Hindu Sabhaites who happened to be "members of municipalities, local bodies, legislatures or those serving in the army...to stick to their posts" across the country, and not to join the Quit India Movement at any cost.

Following the Hindu Mahasabha's official decision to boycott the Quit India movement, Syama Prasad Mukherjee, leader of the Hindu Mahasabha in Bengal (which was a part of the ruling coalition in Bengal led by Krishak Praja Party of Fazlul Haq),  wrote a letter to the British Government as to how they should respond, if the Congress gave a call to the British rulers to Quit India. In this letter, dated July 26, 1942 he wrote: “Let me now refer to the situation that may  be created in the province as a result of any widespread movement launched by the Congress. Anybody, who during the war, plans to stir up mass feeling, resulting internal disturbances or insecurity, must be resisted by any Government that may function for the time being”.  Mookerjee in this letter reiterated that the Fazlul Haq led Bengal Government, along with its alliance partner Hindu Mahasabha would make every possible effort to defeat the Quit India Movement in the province of Bengal and made a concrete proposal as regards this: “The question is how to combat this movement (Quit India) in Bengal? The administration of the province should be carried on in such a manner that in spite of the best efforts of the Congress, this movement will fail to take root in the province. It should be possible for us, especially responsible Ministers, to be able to tell the public that the freedom for which the Congress has started the movement, already belongs to the representatives of the people. In some spheres it might be limited during the emergency. Indian have to trust the British, not for the sake for Britain, not for any advantage that the British might gain, but for the maintenance of the defense and freedom of the province itself. You, as Governor, will function as the constitutional head of the province and will be guided entirely on the advice of your Minister. Even the Indian historian R.C. Majumdar noted this fact and states: "Syama Prasad ended the letter with a discussion of the mass movement organised by the Congress. He expressed the apprehension that the movement would create internal disorder and will endanger internal security during the war by exciting popular feeling and he opined that any government in power has to suppress it, but that according to him could not be done only by persecution.... In that letter he mentioned item wise the steps to be taken for dealing with the situation .... "

Although it opposed untouchability, the Mahasabha's orthodoxy on other matters concerning Hindu law and customs were a handicap in attracting the support of many Hindus.

Savarkar met Subhash Chandra Bose at his residence in Mumbai in 1940. This was the first and only time Savarkar met him. The meeting was part of Bose's efforts to meet all national leaders across party lines.

Assassination of Mahatma Gandhi

In the 1940s, the Muslim League stepped up its demand for a separate Muslim state of Pakistan. The League's great popularity amongst Muslims forced the Congress leaders to hold talks with the League president, Muhammad Ali Jinnah. Even though Savarkar recognised Hindus and Muslims to be separate nations, he condemned Gandhi's eagerness to hold talks with Jinnah and regain Muslim support for the Congress as appeasement. After communal violence claimed the lives of thousands in 1946, Savarkar claimed that Gandhi's adherence to non-violence had left Hindus vulnerable to armed attacks by militant Muslims. When the Congress agreed to divide India in June 1947 after months of talks of power-sharing between the Congress and the League, the Mahasabha condemned the Congress and Gandhi for dividing India.

On January 30, 1948 Nathuram Godse shot Mahatma Gandhi three times and killed him in Delhi. Godse and his fellow conspirators Digambar Badge, Gopal Godse, Narayan Apte, Vishnu Karkare and Madanlal Pahwa were identified as prominent members of the Hindu Mahasabha. Along with them, police arrested Savarkar, who was suspected of being the mastermind behind the plot. While the trial resulted in convictions and judgments against the others, Savarkar was released due to lack of evidence. Many leaders including Dr Babasaheb Ambedkar were convinced that Savarkar's arrest was nothing but a political vendetta. The Kapur Commission said,
All these facts taken together were destructive of any theory other than the conspiracy to murder (of Gandhiji).

Attempts at rehabilitation of Godse
The Hindu Mahasabha considers Nathuram Godse to be a "real forgotten hero" of the independence struggle of India and criticises Gandhi for not having prevented the partition of India. In 2014, following the Bharatiya Janata Party's rise to power, the Hindu Mahasabha began attempts to rehabilitate and portray him as a patriot. It requested Prime Minister Narendra Modi to install the bust of Nathuram Godse. It created a documentary film Desh Bhakt Nathuram Godse (Patriot Nathuram Godse) for release on the death anniversary of Gandhi on 30 January 2015.
There were attempts to build a temple for Nathuram Godse and to celebrate 30 January as a Shaurya Diwas ("Bravery Day"). A civil suit was filed in Pune Court asking for a ban on the documentary film.

Karnataka controversy
In September 2021, the state general secretary for Hindu Mahasabha in Karnataka, Dharmendra, threatened to kill Karnataka Chief Minister Basavaraj Bommai over the demolition of an unlicensed temple in Nanjangud, Mysuru, along with comments about killing Mahatma Gandhi. For these threats, he and two other associates, Rajesh Pavitran and Prem Poolali, were arrested.

Ideology
Although the Hindu Mahasabha did not call for the exclusion of other religious communities from government, it identified India as a Hindu Rashtra ("Hindu Nation") and believed in the primacy of Hindu culture, religion, and heritage. The Hindu Mahasabha advocates that the other Dharmic religions (Sikhism, Jainism, and Buddhism) are identical to Hinduism in terms of teachings and cultural, national, and political identity.

The Hindu Mahasabha argues that Islam and Christianity are foreign non-Indian religions, with their holy places being located in Arabia, Palestine, and Rome, and that Indian Muslims and Christians are simply descendants of Hindus who were converted by force, coercion, and bribery throughout the Islamic and Christian invasions of the Indian subcontinent. At various points in its history, the party called for the re-conversion of Indian Muslims and Christians to Hinduism. The Hindu Mahasabha stridently opposes Westernisation, which it regards as a decadent influence on Indian youth and culture. It calls for a revival of the Sanskrit language. The Hindu Mahasabha opposes socialism, Marxism, and communism as well, since these are regarded as decadent Western ideologies that do not represent India's indigenous needs and conditions.

The Hindu Mahasabha was opposed to the Indian caste system and policies that endorsed untouchability, and used to organize all caste dinners in Nagpur and in Kanpur. Savarkar was very critical of the Indian caste system and untouchability, and among the social institutions, he saw it as the greatest curse of India.

Hindutva
The Hindu Mahasabha promotes the principles of Hindutva, a Hindu nationalist ideology developed by its pre-eminent leader Vinayak Damodar Savarkar. The Mahasabha identifies India as Hindu Rashtra ("Hindu Nation"). Although it broadly supported the Indian National Congress in its efforts to attain national independence, it criticised the Congress commitment to non-violence, civil disobedience, and secularism, as well as its efforts to integrate Indian Muslims and engage in dialogue with the separatist All India Muslim League, which the Hindu Mahasabha deemed to be appeasement.

Ideological positions
In 2015, Vice President of All India Hindu Mahasabha, VP Sadhvi Deva Thakur stated that Christians and Muslims must undergo forced sterilization to restrict their growing population in India, which she considered a threat to Hindus. She declared: "The population of Muslims and Christians is growing day by day. To rein in this, Union will have to impose emergency, and Muslims and Christians will have to be forced to undergo sterilization so that they can't increase their numbers".

In April 2015, the general secretary of the Hindu Mahasabha Munna Kumar Shukla claimed that it is not illegal to attack a church and it does not violate any law. He requested the NDA government to give legal and administrative protection to the Hindus who attack churches. He justified his claim by saying that churches were only conversion factories. Shukla also promised the Mahasabha would give protection and awards to those who marry Muslim girls and attack churches. He also said that Taj Mahal would meet the same fate as Babri masjid as it was a Shiva Temple.

Electoral history in Lok Sabha

See also 
 Bharatiya Janata Party
 History of Hinduism
 Hindu nationalism
 List of Hindu nationalist political parties
 Madan Mohan Malaviya
 Rashtriya Swayamsevak Sangh
 Sangh Parivar

References

Sources

Further reading

External links 
 

1915 establishments in India
Anti-Christian sentiment in Asia
Anti-communist parties
Anti-communism in India
Anti-monarchists
Anti-Islam sentiment in India
Anti-Western sentiment
Conservative parties in India
Far-right politics in India
 
Hindu organisations based in India
Hindu nationalism
Hindutva
Indian Hindu political parties
Islamophobia
Political parties established in 1915
Right-wing parties in Asia
Right-wing populism in Asia
Right-wing populist parties